WKGB-FM (92.5 FM) – branded 92.5 KGB – is a commercial mainstream rock radio station licensed to Conklin, New York, serving Greater Binghamton.  Owned by iHeartMedia, WKGB-FM is the local affiliate for Rover's Morning Glory and Sixx Sense with Nikki Sixx.  The WKGB-FM studios are located in the Binghamton suburb of Vestal, while the station transmitter resides in Binghamton.  In addition to a standard analog transmission, WKGB-FM is available online via TuneIn and iHeartRadio

History
WKGB-FM first began broadcasting on February 11, 1989; at the time, the station aired an album-oriented rock format.

References

External links

IHeartMedia radio stations
Mainstream rock radio stations in the United States
KGB-FM